William C. Smith (born October 26, 1953) is a retired American professional basketball player. He was a 6'2" (1.88 m) 170 lb (77 kg) guard and played collegiately at Seminole Junior College and the University of Missouri, where he earned All-America honors. Smith, nicknamed "Mister Magic", averaged 25.3 points per game during the 1976 season as he led Mizzou to a Big Eight Conference basketball championship.

Professional career
Smith played in the NBA from 1976 to 1980 after being selected with the 1st pick in the second round of the 1976 NBA Draft by the Chicago Bulls. In his four-season NBA career, Smith played with the Bulls, Indiana Pacers, Portland Trail Blazers and Cleveland Cavaliers, averaging 4.6 points, 1.7 rebounds and 3.6 assists per game.

Post-NBA
Since his time in the NBA, Smith has been involved with a number of business ventures and currently resides in Columbia, Missouri. On November 1, 2012 it was announced that Smith would be inducted into the Missouri Sports Hall of Fame on November 15.

References

External links
Willie Smith NBA stats @ basketballreference.com

1953 births
Living people
African-American basketball players
All-American college men's basketball players
American men's basketball players
Basketball players from Nevada
Chicago Bulls draft picks
Chicago Bulls players
Cleveland Cavaliers players
Indiana Pacers players
Junior college men's basketball players in the United States
Missouri Tigers men's basketball players
Montana Golden Nuggets players
Point guards
Portland Trail Blazers players
Rochester Zeniths players
Sarasota Stingers players
Seminole State College (Oklahoma) alumni
Sportspeople from Las Vegas
21st-century African-American people
20th-century African-American sportspeople
Western Basketball Association players